Bogusław Widawski (23 February 1934 – 8 February 1986) was a Polish footballer. He played in one match for the Poland national football team in 1959.

References

External links
 

1934 births
1986 deaths
Polish footballers
Poland international footballers
Place of birth missing
Association footballers not categorized by position